Club Deportivo Robres is a Spanish football team based in Robres, in the autonomous community of Aragon. Founded in 2001, it plays in Tercera División – Group 17, holding home matches at Estadio Municipal San Blas.

Since June 2017, it is the reserve team of CD Ebro.

History 
Founded in 1947, the club reached the Third Division of Spain for the first time in the 2011-12 season.  In the 2018-19 season the club finished 14th in the Tercera División, Group 17.

Season to season

7 seasons in Tercera División

References

External links
 
La Preferente team profile 
Soccerway team profile

Football clubs in Aragon
Association football clubs established in 2001
2001 establishments in Spain